Heterodiamond is a superhard material containing boron, carbon, and nitrogen  (BCN). It is formed at high temperatures and high pressures, e.g., by application of an explosive shock wave to a mixture of diamond and cubic boron nitride (c-BN). The heterodiamond is a polycrystalline material coagulated with nano-crystallites and the fine powder is tinged with deep bluish black. The heterodiamond has both the high hardness of diamond and the excellent heat resistance of cubic BN. These characteristic properties are due to the diamond structure combined with the sp3 σ-bonds among carbon and the hetero atoms.

Cubic BC2N can be synthesized from graphite-like BC2N at pressures above 18 GPa and temperatures higher than 2200 K. The bulk modulus of c-BC2N is 282 GPa which is one of the highest bulk moduli known for any solid, and is exceeded only by the bulk moduli of diamond and c-BN. The hardness of c-BC2N is higher than that of c-BN single crystals.

References

See also
 Boron nitride

Superhard materials
Boron compounds
Carbides
Nitrides